Krynychky Raion was a raion (district) of Dnipropetrovsk Oblast, southeastern-central Ukraine. Its administrative centre was located at the urban-type settlement of Krynychky. The raion was abolished on 18 July 2020 as part of the administrative reform of Ukraine, which reduced the number of raions of Dnipropetrovsk Oblast to seven. The area of Krynychky Raion was merged into Kamianske Raion.

At the time of disestablishment, the raion consisted of three hromadas:
 Bozhedarivka settlement hromada with the administration in the urban-type settlement of Bozhedarivka;
 Krynychky settlement hromada with the administration in Krynychky;
 Zatyshne rural hromada with the administration in the selo of Zatyshne.

References

Former raions of Dnipropetrovsk Oblast
1923 establishments in Ukraine
Ukrainian raions abolished during the 2020 administrative reform